Area code 559 is a California telephone area code that was split from area code 209 on November 14, 1998.

It covers the central San Joaquin Valley in central California, serving the counties of Fresno, Madera, Kings, and Tulare—an area largely coextensive with the Fresno and Visalia-Porterville metropolitan areas.

Service
The 559 area code serves the Central California counties of Fresno, Madera, Kings, and Tulare.

The major cities within the 559 area code region are Fresno, Coalinga, Clovis, Madera, Sanger, Reedley, Dinuba, Selma, Tulare, Visalia, Hanford, Lemoore,  Porterville, Avenal, and Kingsburg.

Cities and communities in the 559 area code

Fresno County

Auberry
Big Creek
Biola
Bowles
Calwa
Cantua Creek
Caruthers
Clovis
Coalinga
Del Rey
Dunlap
Easton
Firebaugh
Fowler
Fresno
Friant
Huron
Kerman
Kingsburg
Knowles
Lanare
Laton
Mendota 
Mercey Hot Springs
Orange Cove
Parlier
Pinedale
Prather
Raisin City
Reedley
Riverdale
Rolinda
San Joaquin
Sanger
Selma
Shaver Lake
Squaw Valley
Tollhouse
Tranquillity

Kings County

Armona
Avenal
Corcoran
Hanford
Hardwick
Home Garden
Kettleman City
Lemoore Station
Lemoore
Stratford

Madera County

Ahwahnee
Bonadelle Ranchos-Madera Ranchos
Chowchilla
Coarsegold
Fish Camp
Madera Acres
Madera
Millerton
North Fork
Oakhurst
Parksdale
Parkwood
Raymond
Yosemite Lakes

Tulare County

Alpaugh
Badger
Cutler
Dinuba
Ducor
East Orosi
East Porterville
Exeter
Farmersville
Goshen
Ivanhoe
Lemon Cove
Lindsay
London
Orosi
Pixley
Poplar-Cotton Center
Porterville
Richgrove
Springville
Strathmore
Terra Bella
Three Rivers
Tipton
Traver
Tulare
Visalia
Woodlake
Woodville

History

Like many other regions that had experienced area code changes during the area code boom of the 1990s, both 559 and 209 were in the early planning stages of relief, potentially creating the need for introduction of further new area codes.  Yet by 2002, number pooling was being enforced in the 209 and 559 area codes.  Instead of handing out numbers in blocks of 10,000 to private companies (as had been normal practice since the beginning of the NANP in 1947), only 1,000 numbers would be handed out at a time.  For example, instead of granting Pacific Bell all numbers (559) 330-xxxx, only numbers (559) 330-0xxx, or (559) 330-1xxx or (559) 330-2xxx, and so on, would be granted.

See also
List of California area codes
List of NANP area codes
North American Numbering Plan

Sources

 LincMad 
 AreaCode-Info

External links
North American Numbering Plan Administration
Area code map of California from whitepages.com
 559 Area Code from AreaCodeDownload.com

559
Fresno County, California
Madera County, California
Kings County, California
Tulare County, California
San Joaquin Valley
Telecommunications-related introductions in 1998
559